Niddrie railway station served the suburb of Niddrie, Edinburgh, Scotland from 1843 to 1950 on the Edinburgh and Dalkeith Railway.

History 
The station opened in June 1843 by the Edinburgh and Dalkeith Railway. It was situated on the north side of New Craig Hall Road on the A6095. The station closed in October 1847 when the line closed for re-gauging. It reopened on 1 June 1860, closing again four months later on 1 October 1860. It reopened again on 1 December 1864 but closed to passengers for the third and last time in January 1869. The station stayed open for goods traffic until 1950.

References

External links 

Disused railway stations in Edinburgh
Former North British Railway stations
Railway stations in Great Britain opened in 1843
Railway stations in Great Britain closed in 1847
Railway stations in Great Britain opened in 1860
Railway stations in Great Britain closed in 1860
Railway stations in Great Britain opened in 1864
Railway stations in Great Britain closed in 1869
1843 establishments in Scotland
1950 disestablishments in Scotland